Eels Lake is a lake located between the Kawartha lakes and Haliburton Highlands region of Ontario, Canada.

Eel Cow, an Ojibwe chieftain, for which the lake is named, claimed this area and surrounding land as his family's hunting and fishing territory in the early 1800s.

The many islands and bays found in the lake make for ideal smallmouth bass, largemouth bass and Rock bass habitat. The lake also has natural population of lake trout, walleye, and yellow perch. In order to help preserve the natural lake trout population of Eels Lake, slot size and winter ice fishing restrictions are in place.

See also
List of lakes in Ontario

References
 National Resources Canada

Lakes of Peterborough County
Lakes of Haliburton County